Social Boston Sports (SBS) was created in January 2007 by four professionals, Justin Obey, Brian Shaw, John Sharry, and Frank Knippenberg. SBS is an organization that provides a way for young professionals to become involved in events, parties, and coed recreational sports and activities throughout Boston.

References

External links 
Social Boston Sports

Companies based in Massachusetts
Privately held companies based in Massachusetts